A cooktop (American English), stovetop (American English) or hob (British English), is a device commonly used for cooking that is commonly found in kitchens and used to apply heat to the base of pans or pots. Cooktops are often found integrated with an oven into a kitchen stove but may also be standalone devices. Cooktops are commonly powered by gas or electricity, though oil or other fuels are sometimes used.

Gas

Gas cooktops consist of one or more gas burners with arrangements to control the rate of flow. They often have integral lighters or (in older models) pilot lights, and may have safety interlocks designed to reduce the risk of hazardous gas leaks.

Gas cooking has been associated with negative health effects, such as reduced pulmonary function and a higher rate of respiratory symptoms in children.

Electric

Coil
Electric coil cooktops use electric heating elements that directly heat pots placed on them. They are inexpensive to buy and maintain, but are considered more difficult to clean than smooth-top models.

Ceramic

A ceramic hob consists of a low-expansion thermal glass-ceramic that is transparent to infrared. This surface houses radiant or halogen heaters below it. The advantage of this arrangement is that the heat can be quickly controlled.

Induction

Induction cooking involves the electrical heating of a cooking vessel by magnetic induction instead of by radiation or thermal conduction from an electrical heating element or from a flame. Because inductive heating directly heats the vessel, very rapid increases in temperature can be achieved and changes in heat settings are fast, similar to gas.

In an induction cooktop ("induction hob" or "induction stove"), a coil of copper wire is placed under the cooking pot, and an alternating electric current is passed through it. The resulting oscillating magnetic field induces a magnetic flux that repeatedly magnetises the pot, treating it like the lossy magnetic core of a transformer. This produces large eddy currents in the pot, which, because of the resistance of the pot, heat it.

For nearly all models of induction cooktops, a cooking vessel must be made of, or contain, a ferromagnetic metal such as cast iron or some stainless steels. However, copper, glass, non-magnetic stainless steels, and aluminum vessels can be used if placed on a ferromagnetic disk that functions as a conventional hotplate.

Induction cooking is quite efficient, which means it puts less waste heat into the kitchen, can be quickly turned off, and has safety advantages compared to gas stoves. Cooktops are also usually easy to clean, because the cooktop itself does not get very hot. However, they must be regularly maintained to prevent dirt buildup and possible damage.

If the induction coil is of lesser diameter than the cooking pot, and the pot has low thermal conductivity, use of high power can potentially warp the pot due to non-uniform heating. 6" coils are common in low-end portable units, which is smaller than most pots and pans.

Ventilation and exhaust
Cooktops often have a kitchen hood installed overhead to expel or filter smoke, fumes and undesirable odors that result from cooking. However, when installation of an updraft ventilation system is undesirable or impossible (for example in an open kitchen design), a cooktop with an integrated downdraft ventilation system can be used instead. Such systems draw cooking fumes downwards rather than upwards, eliminating the need of an overhead installation. They are however less effective than overhead systems, and may not be able to extract fumes emanating from taller pots.

Placement

Installed
Cooktops are virtually ubiquitous in kitchens. They may be built into a stove along with an oven. Alternatively, cooktops are often installed independently in work surfaces.

Hot plate

A hot plate is a portable self-contained tabletop small appliance cooktop that features one, two or more electric heating elements or gas burners. A hot plate can be used as a standalone appliance, but is often used as a substitute for one of the burners from an oven range or a kitchen stove. 

Hot plates are often used for food preparation, generally in locations where a full kitchen stove would not be convenient or practical. A hot plate can have a flat or round surface. Hot plates can be used for traveling or in areas without electricity.

References

Cooking appliances